Novelty and fad dances are dances which are typically characterized by a short burst of popularity. Some of them, like the Twist, Y.M.C.A. and the Hokey Pokey, have shown much longer-lasting lives. They are also called dance fads or dance crazes.

Fad dances
As the pop music market got bombed in the late 1950s, dance fads were commercialized and exploited. From the 1950s to the 1970s, new dance fads appeared almost every week. Many were popularized (or commercialized) versions of new styles or steps created by African-American dancers who frequented the clubs and discothèques in major U.S. cities like New York, Philadelphia and Detroit. Among these were the Madison, "The Swim", the "Mashed Potato", "The Twist", "The Frug" (pronounced ), "The Watusi", "The Shake" and "The Hitch hike". Many 1950s and 1960s dance crazes had animal names, including "The Chicken" (not to be confused with the Chicken Dance), "The Pony" and "The Dog".

In 1965, Latin group Cannibal and the Headhunters had a hit with the 1962 Chris Kenner song Land of a Thousand Dances which included the names of such dances. One list of Fad Dances compiled in 1971 named over ninety dances. Standardized versions of dance moves were published in dance and teen magazines, often choreographed to popular songs. Songs such as "The Loco-Motion" were specifically written with the intention of creating a new dance and many more pop hits, such as "Mashed Potato Time" by Dee Dee Sharp, were written to cash in recent successful novelties.

In the early 1970s, disco spawned a succession of dance fads including the Bump, the Hustle, and the Y.M.C.A. This continued in the 1980s with the popular song "Walk like an Egyptian", in the 1990s with the "Macarena", in the 2000s with "The Ketchup Song" and in the 2010s with "Gangnam Style". Contemporary sources for dance crazes include music videos and movies.

There are fad dances which are meant to be danced individually as solo, others are partner dances, and yet others are danced in groups. Some of them were of freestyle type, i.e., there were no particular step patterns and they were distinguished by the style of the dance movement (Twist, Shake, Swim, Pony, Hitch hike). Only some have remained to the modern day-era, sometimes only as the name of a step (Suzie Q, Shimmy) or of a style (Mashed Potato) in a recognized dance. Fad dances are in fashion at the time of their popularity. They come to be associated with a specific time period, and can evoke particular forms of nostalgia when revived.

Notable novelty and fad dances

Pre-1950s

1950s

1960s

1970s

1980s

1990s

2000s

2010s

2020s

See also
 Outline of dance for a list of general dance topics.
 Summer hit
 List of specific dances for a general, noncategorized index of dances

References

External links
 Streetswing.com's Dance History Archives hosts a large information base about more than thousand dances.
 Dance Crazes of the 50s & 60s - by Dr. Frank Hoffmann
 sixtiescity - 60s Dance and Dance Crazes
 Go-Go Dancing - Fad and Novelty Dances from the 1960s at Little Miss Go-Go!